The Icarus Agenda is a 1988 thriller novel by bestselling author Robert Ludlum.  It is the sequel to The Chancellor Manuscript.

Plot introduction
Evan Kendrick is a U.S. Congressman from a remote Western Colorado district. As a former building contractor in the Middle East, he is close friends with the Sultan of Oman. He returns to Oman under deep cover when the U.S. Embassy in Masqat is taken by terrorists. During his time undercover he unmasks a far-reaching terror network aimed at controlling the economies and governments of the Middle East.

Plot summary
A few years before, a tragic "accident" left him with 78 fewer friends. The only loved-one left was Emmanuel "Manny" Weingrass, a world-renowned architect and a somewhat impossible person. In his first year in Congress, there is an uprising in Masqat - a hostage taking. The events remind him of a man known as The Mahdi whom Weingrass said was the reason for the deaths of his 78 friends. He goes to Oman for revenge and comes back victorious. The Mahdi dead and a tragedy averted. A year later, the inheritors of Inver Brass - the resurrected group of influential people, destroyed in the events of the Chancellor Manuscript, who had been tracking him ever since he went on the Oman operation through a specially gifted computer specialist, exposes the truth of Kendrick being involved in Masqat and they reveal this to the world to have Kendrick as Vice-President of the USA, because they consider him to be morally incorruptible. After the revealing, lives are lost and friendships broken, Kendrick is desperately looking for the people who are responsible for turning his life upside-down. But unknown to the Inver Brass there is a traitor in their midst. Codename Icarus is the last hope to a nation and to a world. The organisation was first mentioned in his 1977 novel The Chancellor Manuscript and is also mentioned in his later novel The Bancroft Strategy.

Characters in "The Icarus Agenda"
Evan Kendrick – US congressman and protagonist
Emmanuel "Manny" Weingrass – architect
The Mahdi
The Sultan of Oman
Khalehla

Cultural references
Harry Burns is reading this book in the film When Harry Met Sally... when Sally calls him on the phone about her ex-boyfriend getting married.

Publication history

1988, US, Random House , Pub date February 22, 1988, Hardback
1988, US, Bantam Books , Pub date March 1, 1988, Paperback
1988, UK, Grafton  Pub date March 24, 1988, Hardback
1989, UK, Grafton  Paperback
1998, UK, HarperCollins , Pub date June 15, 1998, Paperback

1988 American novels
Novels by Robert Ludlum
Novels set in Oman